Cephalouterina decamptodoni is a species of trematodes within the family Lecithodendriidae under the order Plagiorchiida. This species is sometimes known to use amphibian hosts.

C. decamptodoni has been isolated within the amphibian host Rough-skinned Newt in British Columbia.

See also
 Flatworm
 Parasite

References

Plagiorchiida
Parasites of amphibians